Dishpan Gap is a cinder cone in Chelan County of Washington, US.

Known for his creative naming of natural features in the Cascade Range, forest supervisor Albert Hale Sylvester named Dishpan Gap for the presence of an "old rusty dishpan discarded by some previous camper".

References

Geography of Washington (state)
Cinder cones of the United States
Cascade Volcanoes
Volcanoes of Washington (state)